The 2012 NHL Entry Draft was the 50th NHL Entry Draft. The draft was held June 22–23, 2012, at Consol Energy Center in Pittsburgh, Pennsylvania. It was the first time that Pittsburgh hosted the draft since the 1997 NHL Entry Draft. The top three picks were Nail Yakupov going to the Edmonton Oilers, Ryan Murray going to the Columbus Blue Jackets, and Alex Galchenyuk going to the Montreal Canadiens.

Eligibility
Ice hockey players born between January 1, 1992, and September 15, 1994, were eligible for selection in the 2012 NHL Entry Draft. Additionally, un-drafted, non-North American players over the age of 20 are eligible for the draft; and those players who were drafted in the 2010 NHL Entry Draft, but not signed by an NHL team and who were born after June 24, 1992, were also eligible to re-enter the draft.

Draft lottery
The NHL draft lottery enables a team to move up to four spots ahead in the draft. Thus, only the bottom five teams were eligible to receive the number one draft pick. Beginning with the 2013 NHL Entry Draft all fourteen teams not qualifying for the Stanley Cup playoffs will have a "weighted" chance at winning the first overall selection. The Edmonton Oilers won the 2012 draft lottery that took place on April 10, 2012, thus moving them up from the second pick to the first pick.

Top prospects

Source: NHL Central Scouting final (April 9, 2012) ranking.

Selections by round

Round one

Notes
 The Carolina Hurricanes' first-round pick went to the Pittsburgh Penguins as the result of a trade on June 22, 2012, that sent Jordan Staal to Carolina in exchange for Brandon Sutter, Brian Dumoulin and this pick.
 The Colorado Avalanche's first-round pick went to the Washington Capitals as the result of a trade on July 1, 2011, that sent Semyon Varlamov to Colorado in exchange for a second-round pick in either 2012 or 2013 and this pick.
 The Calgary Flames' first-round pick went to the Buffalo Sabres as the result of a trade on June 22, 2012, that sent Nashville's first-round pick in 2012 (21st overall) and Buffalo's second-round pick in 2012 (42nd overall) to Calgary for this pick.
 The Detroit Red Wings' first-round pick went to the Tampa Bay Lightning as the result of a trade on February 21, 2012, that sent Kyle Quincey to Detroit in exchange for Sebastien Piche and this pick.
 The Nashville Predators' first-round pick went to the Calgary Flames as the result of a trade on June 22, 2012, that sent Calgary's first-round pick in 2012 (14th overall) to Buffalo in exchange for Buffalo's second-round pick in 2012 (42nd overall) and this pick.
Buffalo previously acquired this pick as the result of a trade on February 27, 2012, that sent Paul Gaustad and Buffalo's fourth-round draft pick in 2013 to Nashville in exchange for this pick.

Round two

Notes
 The Minnesota Wild's second-round pick went to the Nashville Predators as the result of a trade on June 15, 2012, that sent Anders Lindback, Kyle Wilson and Nashville's seventh-round pick in 2012 to Tampa Bay in exchange for Sebastien Caron, Philadelphia's second-round pick in 2012, Tampa Bay's third-round pick in 2013 and this pick.
Tampa Bay previously acquired this pick as the result of a trade on February 16, 2012, that sent Dominic Moore and a seventh-round pick in 2012 to San Jose in exchange for this pick.
San Jose previously acquired this pick as the result of a trade on June 24, 2011, that sent Devin Setoguchi, Charlie Coyle and a first-round pick in 2011 to Minnesota in exchange for Brent Burns and this pick.
 The Buffalo Sabres' second-round pick went to the Calgary Flames as the result of a trade on June 22, 2012, that sent Calgary's first-round pick in 2012 (14th overall) to Buffalo in exchange for Nashville's first-round pick in 2012 (21st overall) and this pick.
 The Calgary Flames' second-round pick went to the Buffalo Sabres as the result of a trade on June 25, 2011, that sent Chris Butler and Paul Byron to Calgary in exchange for Robyn Regehr, Ales Kotalik and this pick.
 The Ottawa Senators' second-round pick went to the Philadelphia Flyers as a result of a trade on June 22, 2012, that sent Sergei Bobrovsky to Columbus in exchange for Vancouver's fourth-round pick in 2012, Phoenix's fourth round pick in 2013, and this pick. 
Columbus previously acquired this pick as a result of a trade on February 22, 2012, that sent Antoine Vermette to Phoenix in exchange for Curtis McElhinney, a conditional fourth-round pick in 2013 and this pick.
Phoenix previously acquired this pick as a result of a trade on December 17, 2011, that sent Kyle Turris to Ottawa in exchange for David Rundblad and this pick.
 The Washington Capitals' second-round pick went to the Minnesota Wild as the result of a trade on February 24, 2012, that sent Marek Zidlicky to New Jersey in exchange for Kurtis Foster, Nick Palmieri, Stephane Veilleux, a conditional third-round pick in 2013 and this pick.
New Jersey previously acquired this pick as the result of a trade on February 28, 2011, that sent Jason Arnott to Washington in exchange for Dave Steckel and this pick.
 The San Jose Sharks' second-round pick went to the Carolina Hurricanes as the result of a trade on February 18, 2011, that sent Ian White to San Jose in exchange for this pick.
 The Philadelphia Flyers' second-round pick went to the Nashville Predators as the result of a trade that sent Anders Lindback, Kyle Wilson and Nashville's seventh-round pick in 2012 to Tampa Bay in exchange for Sebastien Caron, Minnesota's second-round pick in 2012, Tampa Bay's third-round pick in 2013 and this pick.
Tampa Bay previously acquired this pick as the result of a trade on July 1, 2010, that sent Andrej Meszaros to Philadelphia in exchange for this pick.
 The Nashville Predators' second-round pick went to the Montreal Canadiens as the result of a trade on February 17, 2012, that sent Hal Gill and a conditional fifth-round pick in 2013 to Nashville in exchange for Blake Geoffrion, Robert Slaney and this pick.
 The Florida Panthers' second-round pick went to the Tampa Bay Lightning as the result of a trade on February 18, 2012, that sent Pavel Kubina to Philadelphia in exchange for Philadelphia's fourth-round pick in 2013, Jon Kalinski and this pick (being conditional at the time of the trade). The condition – Florida will trade a second-round pick in 2012 or 2013 at their choice – was converted on June 23, 2012.
Philadelphia previously acquired this pick as the result of a trade on July 1, 2011, that sent Kris Versteeg to Florida in exchange for San Jose's third-round pick in 2012 and this conditional pick.
 The Boston Bruins' second-round pick went to the Dallas Stars as the result of a trade on June 22, 2012, that sent Mike Ribeiro to Washington in exchange for Cody Eakin and this pick.
Washington previously acquired this pick as the result of a trade on July 1, 2012, that sent Semyon Varlamov to Colorado in exchange for Colorado's first round pick, as well as this pick. Washington opted to take this pick on June 15, 2012.
Colorado previously acquired this pick as the result of a trade on June 24, 2011, that sent John-Michael Liles to Toronto in exchange for this pick.
Toronto previously acquired the pick as the result of a trade that sent Tomas Kaberle to the Bruins in exchange for Joe Colborne, a first-round pick in 2011, and this pick (being conditional at the time of the trade). The condition – Boston reaching the 2011 Stanley Cup Finals – was converted on May 27, 2011.
 The San Jose Sharks received the 25th pick of this round (55th overall) as compensation for not signing 2007 first-round draft pick Patrick White.
 The Los Angeles Kings' second-round pick went to the Dallas Stars as the result of a trade on February 16, 2012, that sent Nicklas Grossmann to Philadelphia in exchange for Minnesota's third-round pick in 2013 and this pick.
Philadelphia previously acquired this pick as the result of a trade on June 23, 2011, that sent Mike Richards to Los Angeles in exchange for Wayne Simmonds, Brayden Schenn and this pick.

Round three

Notes
 The Toronto Maple Leafs' third-round pick went to the Nashville Predators as the result of a trade on June 25, 2011, that sent Nashville's third-round pick in 2011 to Los Angeles in exchange for Los Angeles' sixth-round pick in 2011 and this pick.
Los Angeles previously acquired the pick as the result of a trade on June 26, 2010, that sent Los Angeles' third-round pick in 2010 to Toronto in exchange for this pick.
 The Anaheim Ducks' third-round pick went to the St. Louis Blues as the result of a trade on February 28, 2011, that sent Brad Winchester to Anaheim in exchange for this pick.
 The San Jose Sharks' third-round pick went to the Philadelphia Flyers as the result of a trade on July 1, 2011, that sent Kris Versteeg to Florida in exchange for a conditional second-round pick in either 2012 or 2013 and this pick.
Florida previously acquired this pick as the result of a trade on June 25, 2011, that sent a second-round pick in 2011 to San Jose in exchange for a second-round pick in 2011 and this pick.
 The Philadelphia Flyers' third-round pick went to Pittsburgh Penguins as the result of a trade on June 22, 2012, that sent Zbynek Michalek to Phoenix in exchange for Harrison Ruopp, Marc Cheverie and this pick.
Phoenix had previously acquired this pick as the result of a trade on June 7, 2011, that sent Ilya Bryzgalov to Philadelphia in exchange for Matt Clackson, a conditional third-round pick in 2011 and future considerations (which became this pick).
 The Nashville Predators' third-round pick went to the Ottawa Senators as the result of a trade on February 10, 2011, that sent Mike Fisher to Nashville in exchange for a first-round pick in 2011 and this pick (being conditional at the time of the trade). The condition – Nashville wins one round of the 2011 Stanley Cup playoffs – was converted on April 24, 2011.
 The Vancouver Canucks' third-round pick went to the Anaheim Ducks as the result of a trade on February 28, 2011, that sent Maxim Lapierre and MacGregor Sharp to Vancouver in exchange for Joel Perrault and this pick.
 The New York Rangers' third-round pick went to the Nashville Predators as the result of a trade on June 23, 2012, that sent Nashville's third-round pick in 2013 to the New York Rangers for this pick.
 The Los Angeles Kings' third-round pick went to the Edmonton Oilers as the result of a trade on February 28, 2011, that sent Dustin Penner to Los Angeles in exchange for Colten Teubert, a first-round pick in 2011 and this pick (being conditional at the time of the trade). The condition – Los Angeles will not win the 2011 Stanley Cup – was converted on April 25, 2011.

Round four

Notes
 The Columbus Blue Jackets' fourth-round pick went to the Pittsburgh Penguins as the result of a trade on November 8, 2011, that sent Mark Letestu to Columbus in exchange for this pick.
 The New York Islanders' fourth-round pick went to the Columbus Blue Jackets as the result of a trade on February 27, 2012, that sent Samuel Pahlsson to Vancouver in exchange for Vancouver's fourth-round pick in 2012 and this pick.
Vancouver previously acquired this pick as the result of a trade on June 28, 2011, that sent Christian Ehrhoff to New York in exchange for this pick.
 The Toronto Maple Leafs' fourth-round pick went to the New Jersey Devils as the result of a trade on October 4, 2011, that sent Dave Steckel to Toronto in exchange for this pick.
 The Winnipeg Jets' fourth-round pick went to the Washington Capitals as the result of a trade on July 8, 2011, that sent Eric Fehr to Winnipeg in exchange for Danick Paquette and this pick.
 The Colorado Avalanche's fourth-round pick went to the Phoenix Coyotes as the result of a trade on June 28, 2010, that sent Daniel Winnik to Colorado in exchange for this pick.
 The Buffalo Sabres' fourth-round pick went to the New York Islanders as the result of a trade on June 29, 2011, that sent Christian Ehrhoff to Buffalo in exchange for this pick.
 The San Jose Sharks' fourth-round pick went to the Anaheim Ducks as the result of a trade on March 4, 2009, that sent Travis Moen and Kent Huskins to San Jose in exchange for Nick Bonino, Timo Pielmeier, a conditional pick in either 2009 or 2011 and this pick (being conditional at the time of the trade). The condition – San Jose re-signs at least one of Moen or Huskins while Anaheim signs neither of the two players – was converted on July 9 and 10, 2009.
 The Chicago Blackhawks' fourth-round pick went to the San Jose Sharks as the result of a trade on June 23, 2012, that sent Tampa Bay's seventh-round pick in 2012 (191st overall) and San Jose's fourth-round pick in 2013 to Chicago in exchange for this pick.
 The Boston Bruins' fourth-round pick went to the Carolina Hurricanes as the result of a trade on July 5, 2011, that sent Joe Corvo to Boston in exchange for this pick.
 The Vancouver Canucks' fourth-round pick went to the Philadelphia Flyers as a result of a trade on June 22, 2012, that sent Sergei Bobrovsky to Columbus in exchange for Ottawa's second-round pick in 2012, Phoenix's fourth-round pick in 2013, and this pick.
Columbus previously acquired this pick as a result of a trade on February 27, 2012, that sent Samuel Pahlsson to Vancouver in exchange for the NY Islanders' fourth-round pick in 2012 and this pick.
 The Phoenix Coyotes' fourth-round pick went to the Nashville Predators as the result of a trade on October 28, 2011, that sent Cal O'Reilly to Phoenix in exchange for this pick.
 The New Jersey Devils' fourth-round pick went to the Carolina Hurricanes as the result of a trade on January 20, 2012, that sent Alexei Ponikarovsky to New Jersey in exchange for Joe Sova and this pick.

Round five

Notes
 The Columbus Blue Jackets' fifth-round pick went to the Montreal Canadiens as the result of a trade on June 29, 2011, that sent James Wisniewski to Columbus in exchange for this pick (being conditional at the time of the trade). The condition – Wisniewski is signed by Columbus for the 2011–12 NHL season – was converted on July 1, 2011.
 The Montreal Canadiens' fifth-round pick went to the Calgary Flames as the result of a trade on January 12, 2012, that sent Rene Bourque, Patrick Holland and Calgary's second-round pick in 2013 to Montreal in exchange for Michael Cammalleri, Karri Ramo and this pick.
 The Anaheim Ducks' fifth-round pick was re-acquired from the Montreal Canadiens as the result of a trade on February 16, 2011, that sent Paul Mara to Montreal in exchange for this pick.
Montreal previously acquired the pick as the result of a trade on December 31, 2010, that sent Maxim Lapierre to Anaheim in exchange for Brett Festerling and this pick.
 The Tampa Bay Lightning's fifth-round pick will go to the Boston Bruins as the result of a trade on June 23, 2012, that sent Benoit Pouliot to Tampa Bay in exchange for Michel Ouellet and this pick.
 The Calgary Flames' fifth-round pick went to the New Jersey Devils as the result of a trade on July 14, 2011, that sent Pierre-Luc Letourneau-Leblond to Calgary in exchange for this pick.
 The Nashville Predators' fifth-round pick went to the New York Rangers as the result of a trade on June 23, 2012, that sent New York's fifth-round pick in 2013 to Nashville in exchange for this pick.
 The Florida Panthers' fifth-round pick went to the Dallas Stars as the result of a trade on December 7, 2011, that sent Krys Barch and a sixth-round pick to Florida in exchange for Jake Hauswirth and this pick.
 The New York Rangers' fifth-round pick went to the Chicago Blackhawks as the result of a trade on February 27, 2012, that sent John Scott to New York in exchange for this pick.

Round six

Notes
 The Anaheim Ducks' sixth-round pick went to the Toronto Maple Leafs as the result of a trade on June 25, 2011, that sent a sixth-round pick in 2011 to Anaheim in exchange for this pick.
 The Dallas Stars' sixth-round pick went to the Nashville Predators as the result of a trade on February 24, 2012, that sent Jerred Smithson to Florida in exchange for this pick.
Florida previously acquired this pick as the result of a trade on December 7, 2011, that sent Jake Hauswirth and a fifth-round pick to Dallas in exchange for Krys Barch and this pick.
 The Philadelphia Flyers' sixth-round pick went to the Los Angeles Kings as the result of a trade on October 12, 2011, that sent future considerations to Philadelphia in exchange for Stefan Legein and this pick.
 The New York Rangers' sixth-round pick went to the Nashville Predators as the result of a trade on June 25, 2011, that sent a sixth-round pick in 2011 to New York in exchange for this pick.

Round seven

Notes
 The Edmonton Oilers' seventh-round pick went to the Dallas Stars as the result of a trade on June 23, 2012, that sent Dallas' seventh-round pick in 2013 to Los Angeles in exchange for this pick.
Los Angeles previously acquired this pick as the result of a trade on June 26, 2011, that sent Ryan Smyth to Edmonton in exchange for Colin Fraser and this pick.
 The Montreal Canadiens' seventh-round pick went to the Phoenix Coyotes as a result of a trade on October 23, 2011, that sent Petteri Nokelainen and Garrett Stafford to Montreal in exchange for Brock Trotter and this pick.
 The Toronto Maple Leafs' seventh-round pick went to the Calgary Flames as the result of a trade on July 27, 2009, that sent Wayne Primeau and Calgary's second-round draft pick in 2011 to Toronto in exchange for Anton Stralman, Colin Stuart and this pick.
 The Tampa Bay Lightning's seventh-round pick went to the Chicago Blackhawks as the result of a trade on June 23, 2012, that sent Chicago's fourth-round pick in 2012 to San Jose in exchange for San Jose's fourth-round pick in 2013 and this pick.
San Jose previously acquired this pick as the result of a trade on February 16, 2012, that sent Minnesota's second-round pick in 2012 to Tampa Bay in exchange for Dominic Moore and this pick.
 The Dallas Stars' seventh-round pick went to the Florida Panthers as the result of a trade on June 23, 2012, that sent Florida's seventh-round pick in 2013 to Dallas in exchange for this pick.
 The Calgary Flames' seventh-round pick went to the Washington Capitals as a result of a trade on July 17, 2009, that sent Keith Seabrook to Calgary in exchange for this pick, originally presented as "future considerations".
 The Nashville Predators' seventh-round pick went to the Tampa Bay Lightning as the result of a trade on June 15, 2012, that sent Sebastien Caron, Minnesota's second-round pick in 2012, Philadelphia's second-round pick in 2012 and Tampa Bay's third-round pick in 2013 to Nashville in exchange for Anders Lindback, Kyle Wilson and this pick.
 The Pittsburgh Penguins' seventh-round pick went to the Washington Capitals as the result of a trade on June 4, 2012, that sent Tomas Vokoun to Pittsburgh in exchange for this pick.
 The Florida Panthers' seventh-round pick went to the Buffalo Sabres as the result of a trade on June 29, 2011, that sent Steve Montador to Chicago in exchange for this pick (being conditional at the time of the trade). The condition, which was carried over from an earlier trade between Chicago and Florida – Florida's seventh-round pick in 2012 would be available – was converted on July 7, 2011 when Alexander Sulzer was signed by the Vancouver Canucks, meaning that a condition of a trade between Florida and the Nashville Predators involving Sulzer and this pick did not come into effect.
Chicago previously acquired the pick as the result of a trade on June 26, 2011, that sent Tomas Kopecky to Florida in exchange for this pick.
 The New York Rangers' seventh-round pick went to the Toronto Maple Leafs as the result of a trade on February 28, 2011, that sent John Mitchell to New York in exchange for this pick.
 The New Jersey Devils' seventh-round pick went to the Anaheim Ducks as the result of a trade on December 12, 2011, that sent Kurtis Foster and Timo Pielmeier to New Jersey in exchange for this Rod Pelley, Mark Fraser and this pick.

Draftees based on nationality

North American draftees by state/province

Further reading
Meltzer's Musings: Vasiliev and the Risks/Rewards of KHL Draftees

See also
 2009–10 NHL transactions
 2010–11 NHL transactions
 2011–12 NHL transactions
 2012–13 NHL season
 List of first overall NHL draft picks
 List of NHL players

References

External links
Official Site
2012 NHL Entry Draft at Hockey Reference
2012 NHL Entry Draft player stats at The Internet Hockey Database

National Hockey League Entry Draft
NHL Entry Draft
Draft
National Hockey League in Pittsburgh
2010s in Pittsburgh